George Raft "Scrap Iron" Johnson (December 15, 1938 – April 9, 2016) was an American heavyweight boxer whose career spanned the 1950s, 1960s and 1970s.  Johnson fought many of the top fighters of his era, including George Foreman, Joe Frazier, Sonny Liston, Jerry Quarry, Duane Bobick, Joe Bugner and Eddie Machen.  Whilst a journeyman fighter he was nonetheless notorious for being extremely durable. He could take vast amounts of punishment. George Foreman said he had the best chin of all his opponents. He retired in 1975 with a record of 22-27-5. He was inducted into the California Boxing Hall of Fame in 2005.

Johnson was nicknamed "Scrap" by girls in his neighborhood in Oklahoma City when he was about seven years old, because he used a wheelbarrow to salvage machinery parts to earn money.  By high school, his American football teammates tacked on the "iron."

In 1969, after putting together a string of wins, Johnson was defeated by Sonny Liston in Las Vegas after seven rounds.  Johnson had been scheduled to get married at midnight after the fight, but pushed off the wedding to the next day to recover.  Johnson later claimed "Liston hit me so hard, I married the wrong woman."

Professional boxing record

|-
|align="center" colspan=8|22 Wins (11 knockouts, 11 decisions), 27 Losses (12 knockouts, 15 decisions), 5 Draws
|-
| align="center" style="border-style: none none solid solid; background: #e3e3e3"|Result
| align="center" style="border-style: none none solid solid; background: #e3e3e3"|Record
| align="center" style="border-style: none none solid solid; background: #e3e3e3"|Opponent
| align="center" style="border-style: none none solid solid; background: #e3e3e3"|Type
| align="center" style="border-style: none none solid solid; background: #e3e3e3"|Round
| align="center" style="border-style: none none solid solid; background: #e3e3e3"|Date
| align="center" style="border-style: none none solid solid; background: #e3e3e3"|Location
| align="center" style="border-style: none none solid solid; background: #e3e3e3"|Notes
|-align=center
|Loss
|
|align=left| Duane Bobick
|RTD
|4
|13/11/1975
|align=left| Met Center, Bloomington, Minnesota
|align=left|
|-
|Draw
|
|align=left| Scott LeDoux
|PTS
|10
|14/08/1975
|align=left| Saint Paul Civic Center, Saint Paul, Minnesota
|align=left|
|-
|Loss
|
|align=left| Leroy Jones
|PTS
|10
|18/03/1975
|align=left| Honolulu, Hawaii
|align=left|
|-
|Loss
|
|align=left| Jerry Quarry
|UD
|10
|25/02/1975
|align=left| Hawaii International Center, Honolulu, Hawaii
|align=left|
|-
|Loss
|
|align=left| Johnny Boudreaux
|PTS
|10
|16/09/1974
|align=left| Houston, Texas
|align=left|
|-
|Loss
|
|align=left| Boone Kirkman
|UD
|10
|23/10/1973
|align=left| Seattle Center Arena, Seattle, Washington
|align=left|
|-
|Win
|
|align=left| Joe Tiger Harris
|TKO
|3
|02/07/1973
|align=left| Las Vegas, Nevada
|align=left|
|-
|Win
|
|align=left| John Robinson
|KO
|2
|16/05/1973
|align=left| Las Vegas, Nevada
|align=left|
|-
|Win
|
|align=left| Terry Sorrell
|KO
|5
|25/04/1973
|align=left| Las Vegas, Nevada
|align=left|
|-
|Win
|
|align=left| Dave Sherman
|TKO
|2
|11/04/1973
|align=left| Las Vegas, Nevada
|align=left|
|-
|Loss
|
|align=left| Ron Lyle
|KO
|3
|25/03/1972
|align=left| Denver, Colorado
|align=left|
|-
|Loss
|
|align=left| Juergen Blin
|TKO
|2
|01/10/1971
|align=left| Hamburg, Germany
|align=left|
|-
|Win
|
|align=left| MacArthur Swindell
|PTS
|10
|30/06/1971
|align=left| Silver Slipper, Paradise, Nevada
|align=left|
|-
|Loss
|
|align=left| Joe Bugner
|PTS
|10
|03/11/1970
|align=left| Royal Albert Hall, London, England
|align=left|
|-
|Loss
|
|align=left| George Foreman
|TKO
|7
|16/05/1970
|align=left| Great Western Forum, Inglewood, California
|align=left|
|-
|Loss
|
|align=left| Jerry Quarry
|UD
|10
|19/03/1970
|align=left| Olympic Auditorium, Los Angeles, California
|align=left|
|-
|Loss
|
|align=left| Sonny Liston
|TKO
|7
|19/05/1969
|align=left| Las Vegas Convention Center, Winchester, Nevada
|align=left|
|-
|Win
|
|align=left| Bob Felstein
|PTS
|10
|18/02/1969
|align=left| Olympic Auditorium, Los Angeles, California
|align=left|
|-
|Win
|
|align=left| Alvin Tiger
|TKO
|6
|02/10/1968
|align=left| Silver Slipper, Paradise, Nevada
|align=left|
|-
|Win
|
|align=left| Roy Wallace
|UD
|10
|22/08/1968
|align=left| Olympic Auditorium, Los Angeles, California
|align=left|
|-
|Win
|
|align=left| Ray White
|UD
|10
|28/11/1967
|align=left| Community Concourse, San Diego, California
|align=left|
|-
|Win
|
|align=left| Earl Averette
|UD
|10
|26/10/1967
|align=left| Olympic Auditorium, Los Angeles, California
|align=left|
|-
|Win
|
|align=left| Santo Amonti
|TKO
|10
|02/08/1967
|align=left| Los Angeles Sports Arena, Los Angeles, California
|align=left|
|-
|Loss
|
|align=left| Joe Frazier
|UD
|10
|04/05/1967
|align=left| Olympic Auditorium, Los Angeles, California
|align=left|
|-
|Win
|
|align=left| Otha Brown
|TKO
|7
|15/12/1966
|align=left| Olympic Auditorium, Los Angeles, California
|align=left|
|-
|Loss
|
|align=left| Eddie Machen
|UD
|10
|29/09/1966
|align=left| Olympic Auditorium, Los Angeles, California
|align=left|
|-
|Win
|
|align=left| Emil Umek
|UD
|10
|26/07/1966
|align=left| Stockyards Coliseum, Oklahoma City, Oklahoma
|align=left|
|-
|Loss
|
|align=left| Jerry Quarry
|TKO
|2
|07/04/1966
|align=left| Olympic Auditorium, Los Angeles, California
|align=left|
|-
|Draw
|
|align=left| Chuck Leslie
|PTS
|10
|06/01/1966
|align=left| Olympic Auditorium, Los Angeles, California
|align=left|
|-
|Draw
|
|align=left| Manuel Ramos
|PTS
|10
|04/11/1965
|align=left| Olympic Auditorium, Los Angeles, California
|align=left|
|-
|Win
|
|align=left| Jimmy Harryman
|TKO
|10
|21/10/1965
|align=left| Olympic Auditorium, Los Angeles, California
|align=left|
|-
|Loss
|
|align=left| Elmer Rush
|UD
|10
|27/09/1965
|align=left| The Hacienda, Paradise, Nevada
|align=left|
|-
|Loss
|
|align=left| Henry Clark
|PTS
|10
|23/09/1965
|align=left| Kezar Pavilion, San Francisco, California
|align=left|
|-
|Loss
|
|align=left| Amos Lincoln
|KO
|5
|05/08/1965
|align=left| Olympic Auditorium, Los Angeles, California
|align=left|
|-
|Win
|
|align=left| Roy Rogers
|TKO
|7
|22/06/1965
|align=left| Lubbock, Texas
|align=left|
|-
|Loss
|
|align=left| Roy "Cowboy" Rogers
|UD
|10
|09/11/1964
|align=left| Dallas Sportatorium, Dallas, Texas
|align=left|
|-
|Loss
|
|align=left| Thad Spencer
|KO
|4
|04/08/1964
|align=left| Castaways Hotel and Casino, Las Vegas, Nevada
|align=left|
|-
|Loss
|
|align=left| Sonny "Policeman" Moore
|PTS
|10
|25/05/1964
|align=left| Dallas Sportatorium, Dallas, Texas
|align=left|
|-
|Win
|
|align=left| Sonny Moore
|SD
|10
|14/04/1964
|align=left| Lindsayland Auditorium, Oklahoma City, Oklahoma
|align=left|
|-
|Draw
|
|align=left| John L. Davey
|PTS
|10
|07/04/1964
|align=left| Stockyards Coliseum, Oklahoma City, Oklahoma
|align=left|
|-
|Win
|
|align=left| Roy Crear
|SD
|10
|17/03/1964
|align=left| Lindsayland Auditorium, Oklahoma City, Oklahoma
|align=left|
|-
|Win
|
|align=left| Leo Bennett
|TKO
|2
|11/02/1964
|align=left| Stockyards Coliseum, Oklahoma City, Oklahoma
|align=left|
|-
|Draw
|
|align=left| Buddy Turman
|PTS
|10
|05/11/1962
|align=left| Tyler, Texas
|align=left|
|-
|Loss
|
|align=left| Ernie Cab
|KO
|6
|25/04/1961
|align=left| City Auditorium, Houston, Texas
|align=left|
|-
|Loss
|
|align=left| Tod Herring
|KO
|6
|07/03/1961
|align=left| Houston, Texas
|align=left|
|-
|Loss
|
|align=left| Donnie Fleeman
|TKO
|7
|28/11/1960
|align=left| Dallas Memorial Auditorium, Dallas, Texas
|align=left|
|-
|Win
|
|align=left| Leo "Zorro" Bennett
|KO
|1
|15/09/1960
|align=left| Oklahoma City Municipal Auditorium, Oklahoma City, Oklahoma
|align=left|
|-
|Loss
|
|align=left| Floyd Joyner
|PTS
|6
|31/08/1960
|align=left| Albuquerque Civic Auditorium, Albuquerque, New Mexico
|align=left|
|-
|Win
|
|align=left| Benny Lee Bowser
|PTS
|6
|02/08/1960
|align=left| Port Arthur, Texas
|align=left|
|-
|Win
|
|align=left|Donny Blue
|PTS
|6
|13/06/1960
|align=left| Wichita, Kansas
|align=left|
|-
|Loss
|
|align=left| Wayne Heath
|PTS
|6
|12/04/1960
|align=left| Lindsayland Auditorium, Oklahoma City, Oklahoma
|align=left|
|-
|Loss
|
|align=left| Wayne Heath
|PTS
|4
|24/11/1959
|align=left| Lindsayland Auditorium, Oklahoma City, Oklahoma
|align=left|
|-
|Win
|
|align=left| Ted Hester
|PTS
|4
|10/11/1959
|align=left| Lindsayland Auditorium, Oklahoma City, Oklahoma
|align=left|
|-
|Loss
|
|align=left| Johnny "J.C." Carroll
|TKO
|2
|09/06/1958
|align=left| Tucson Sports Center, Tucson, Arizona
|align=left|
|}

References

External links

1938 births
2016 deaths
African-American boxers
Heavyweight boxers
American male boxers
Boxers from Oklahoma
Sportspeople from Oklahoma City
20th-century African-American sportspeople
21st-century African-American people